Aikaterini "Katerina" Sotiriou (born 3 January 1984) is a Greek professional basketball player who plays for Panathinaikos and Greece women's national basketball team. She has represented national team in several Eurobasket Women and in 2010 FIBA World Championship for Women.

References

External links
FIBA Eurobasket Women 2017 profile

Living people
Greek expatriate basketball people in Spain
Greek expatriate basketball people in Italy
Greek women's basketball players
Olympiacos Women's Basketball players
Panathinaikos WBC players
1984 births
Small forwards
Basketball players from Athens
Greek expatriate basketball people in Romania